Bulak (Bulag) is a rural locality (an ulus) in Selenginsky District, Republic of Buryatia, Russia. The population was 21 as of 2010.

Geography 
Bulak is located 7 km northeast of Gusinoozyorsk (the district's administrative centre) by road. Gusinoozyorsk is the nearest rural locality.

References 

Rural localities in Selenginsky District